Roberto Antonio Naveira Filgueiras (born 16 September 1970), better known as Roberto Naveira, is a Spanish judoka. He was born in A Coruña, Spain

Achievements

References

1970 births
Living people
Spanish male judoka
Judoka at the 1996 Summer Olympics
Olympic judoka of Spain
Place of birth missing (living people)
20th-century Spanish people